The Rossiya Bank (Bank Rossiya, in Russian: Акционерный коммерческий банк Россия, АКБ Россия) is a Russian joint stock bank founded on June 27, 1990. The company's headquarters are in Saint Petersburg.

The bank has been associated with the Vladimir Putin regime in Russia. The Pandora Papers leak revealed that the bank built a network of shadow companies that kept offshore wealth for Russian elites.

History

Communist Party ownership and 1991 Soviet coup d'état attempt
On August 23, 1990, a secret memorandum from Vladimir A. Ivashko, who was Gorbachev's deputy general secretary, was issued to organize the transfer of CPSU funds, CPSU financing and support of its operations through associations, ventures, foundations, etc. which are to act as invisible economics. Bank Rossiya was one of the hundreds of entreprises that CPSU financiers used to funnel the party gold away.

In 1990, the CPSU committee of the Leningrad Oblast became Rossiya Bank largest shareholder (48.4%), but after the coup attempt in August 1991 the bank's activity was frozen on 2 September 1991 as it was CPSU-related. It was the first commercial bank to hold accounts for the foreign economic operations of both the regional committee of the CPSU and the local management of the KGB.

In December 1991 its activity was resumed, as the shares had been redeemed on 29 December 1991 by some member ventures of the Leningrad Association of Joint Ventures, shares of which were held by Vladimir Yakunin, Yuriy Kovalchuk, Mikhail Markov, Viktor Myachin, Andrei Fursenko, Sergey Fursenko, Yury Nikolayev.

JV Neva Chance
The Austrian Russian joint venture JV Neva Chance received funds from the Revival of St. Petersburg Foundation, which was co-founded by Anatoly Sobchak and its CEO Alexander Margolis. A Los Angeles branch of the St. Petersburg Foundation was established by Mark Davidovich Lvovich (b. Soviet Union), also known as Mark Neumann, who founded and headed the California firm Trada that received several hundred thousand dollars of "funds of UNI-REM" which Sergei Bagaev, a colleague of Anatoly Sobchak at Leningrad University, headed. Leon Weinstein, an assistant to Neuman at the Los Angeles branch, and his wife Gulnara Afanasyeva were active with the St. Petersburg Foundation when it sponsored Sobchak's visit to Los Angeles.

JV Neva Chance established thirty companies including JV Casino Neva.

Putin's capital support from Leningrad casinos
Beginning in 1991, Vladimir Putin was St Petersburg's chairman of the supervisory board for casinos and gambling and, in 1993, began issuing gambling licenses in which shares were gained by the city of St Petersburg in the company Neva Chance which owned the first St Petersburg casino AOZT Casino because it had the same address and phone numbers as city hall, but later it became JV Casino Neva and opened on 19 August 1991. In 1992 or 1993 it changed its name to Laguna, then in 1997 to Admiral Club or more simply known as Admiral. According to the Yakuza Kinichi Kamiyasu who supplied slot machines with cash prizes to St Petersburg casinos in the 1990s from his Stockholm, Sweden, company Dyna Computer Service AB which was a subsidiary of the Masimichi Iida owned Osaka firm, Dyna Company Ltd., the criminals Gennady Petrov, Alexander Malyshev, and Sergey Kuzmin operated the casino through a Vladimir Putin issued license in order to establish JV Petrodin in 1991. JV Petrodin, which Kamiyasu owned a 35% stake and Gennady Petrov and Sergey Kuzmin owned a 65% stake through their company BXM, used the money from the casinos to provide capital for Bank Rossiya.

Capital outflows from the Soviet Union and Russia
In March 1992, the Yeltsin government contracted Kroll Associates to track down and find very large sums of money that had been removed from the Soviet Union prior to the August 1991 putsch on the Russian White House. In 1992, First Deputy Prime Minister Yegor Timurovich Gaidar said, "Last year saw large-scale privatization by the nomenklatura, privatization by officials for their own personal benefit." Gaidar called the Communists and KGB officials criminals and that a "a vigorous search" for the money trails from state-owned capital had flowed abroad virtually unchecked before the collapse of the Soviet Union in the summer of 1991. On March 15, 1992, the Russian government froze all capital outflows from Russia. On April 4, 1992, Yeltsin issued “The fight against corruption in the public service” decree to provide for maximum transparency of officials and their institutions by providing a listing of their financial obligations, liabilities, securities, income, bank deposits, real estate holdings and their personal property and to prohibit officials from owning businesses. In April 1992, Kroll Associates began their investigations with Joseph Serio heading the Kroll Associates efforts in Moscow. Also, Joseph Rosetti, the vice chairman of Kroll Associates, was in Moscow to assist. The Kroll Associates determined that more than $14 billion in 1991 real dollars had been transferred from Switzerland to New York prior to the August 1991 putsch. Also, the Communist Party of the former Soviet Union along with other government agencies, such as the KGB, had transferred more than $40 billion in 2014 real dollars out of the country. The assests of the Vneshekonombank were frozen during the investigation. However, numerous transactions occurred to bypass the capital flow restrictions often with the British Barclays Bank in Cyprus acting a money laundering center for public officials from Saint Petersburg and Moscow. According to Valery Makharadze, the government's chief inspector, many joint stock companies were formed to provide an illegal means for capital outflows from Russia, such as the Leningrad Association of Joint Ventures and KOLO. Numerous officials became wealthy Russian oligarchs including numerous former KGB officials, prominent Communists such as Oleg Belyakov and other former Communists who headed the party Central Committee department that dealt with the defense industry, as well as Leonid Kravchenko, who was the former head of the state television and radio company. Jules Kroll, the head of the Kroll Associates, uncovered hundreds of illicit transactions with massive capital outflows. This outflow of capital from the Soviet Union and Russia directly contributed to severe economic conditions in Russia during Boris Yeltsin's second term, leading to its collapse, and resulting in the age of Vladimir Putin as the President of Russia.

Organized crime links
From 1998 to 2000 OCG Organized Crime Gang Tambov Gang leaders Gennady Petrov and Sergei Kuzmin each owned 2.2% of bank shares, and they were represented at meetings by Andrei Shumkov, who sat on the Bank's board of directors from 1998 to 2000 (as the Vedomosti business newspaper reported). In 1998 and 1999, 14.2% of Rossia's stock belonged to the St Petersburg firms Ergen, Forward Ltd and Fuel Investment Company (TIK), all associated with Mr Shumkov. Mr Shumkov and Mr Kuzmin owned Ergen, while BKhM and Finance Petroleum Company, both affiliated with Mr Kuzmin and Mr Petrov, were TIK co-owners.

Putin as president of Russia
As of January 1, 2005, its major shareholders were Yuriy Kovalchuk with 37.6%, Nikolai Shamalov with 9.7%, Dmitry Gorelov with 9.7% and Alexei Mordashov's Severstal group with 8.8%. As of 2006, its major shareholders were Yuriy Kovalchuk (30.4%), Dmitry Gorelov (12.58%), Nikolay Shamalov (12.58%), JSC Transoil CIS (9.54%), JSC Severstal Group (7.15%), JSC Accept (3.93%) – owned by grandson of Vladimir Putin's uncle Michael Shelomov, JSC Relax (3.65%), "Assistance to Business Initiatives" Non-Commercial Enterprise (3.08%), Russian Federal Property Fund (2.93%).

On December 28, 2006, Fitch Ratings assigned the bank negative ratings (Long Term issuer Default rating B−, Short Term rating B, National Long Term rating BB− (RUS)). As a subsidiary of the bank, ABRos Investment Company, had signed a non-transparent deal aiming to buy a considerable share of the Ren TV Media Holding (see below). During the 2012–13 financial crisis in Cyprus, more than one third (26.3 billion rubles) of Rossiya Bank's total cash (85.4 billion rubles) was frozen in Cypriot accounts. On June 28, 2013, its major shareholders were Yuri Kovalchuk 30%, Dmitri Gorelov and Nikolai Shamalov 10.5% each, Gennady Timchenko 8%, Gazprom about 16%, Alexei Mordashov 6%. In October 2021, Svetlana Krivonogikh had a 3% stake in Rossiya Bank.

The U.S. government has characterized Rossiya Bank as Putin’s personal cashbox.

Pandora Papers 
The Pandora Papers leak revealed that Rossiya Bank built a network of shadow companies that kept offshore wealth for Russian elites.

Sanctions
On March 20, 2014, the United States Government Office of Foreign Assets Control added Rossiya Bank to the Specially Designated Nationals List (SDN) as part of sanctions taken in response to the 2014 Crimean crisis, placing restrictions on US trade with the bank. Visa and Mastercard stopped processing the bank's payment as a result.

In response Vladimir Putin announced that he would open a ruble-only account with Bank Rossiya and would make it the primary bank in the newly annexed Crimea as well as giving the right to service payments on Russia's $36 billion wholesale electricity market – which gave the bank $112 million annually from commission charges alone. Bank Rossiya also announced plans to expand into the Crimean market, becoming the first major Russian bank to do so.

As of January 2019, Rossiya Bank has become the most important investor in Russia's development of its annexation of Crimea during the ongoing Russo-Ukrainian War.

On February 22, 2022, British Prime Minister Boris Johnson announced sanctions against five banks, including Rossiya Bank.

Assets worth – historical data

Ratings

In February 2021, Russian rating agency Expert RA assigned Rossiya Bank a rating of "ruAA" with a "stable" outlook.

Management
The head of its board of directors were, in order, Vladimir Kolovay and Andrei Katkov. The current head of the board of directors is Yury Kovalchuk, who has held this position since 2004.

Director General and Head of the Management Committee:

 1993–1995: Vitaly Savelyev
 1995–1998: Viktor Myachin
 1998–1999: Mikhail Markov
 1999–2004: Viktor Myachin
 September 2004 – April 2006: Mikhail Klishin
 Since April 2006: Dmitri Lebedev

On September 24, 2004, Viktor Myachin resigned from the Director General position and Mikhail Klishin, who had been the First Deputy Director General and held a 0.197% share, was appointed acting Director General.

On December 10, 2004, Mikhail Klishin was appointed Director General, as the Central Bank of the Russian Federation had agreed to this decision.

On April 3, 2006, the board of directors appointed Dmitry Lebedev Director General and Head of the Management Committee. Mikhail Klishin (holder of a 0.159% share) was appointed First Deputy Director General. The Management Committee appointed on that day: Dmitry Lebedev, Oleg Anufriev, Alexander Germanov, Konstantin Gorbachyov, Faniya Kabalina, Mikhail Klishin, Galina Lebedeva, Alexander Markin, Oleg Filatov.

On December 26, 2006, the board of directors of the Bank elected its new Management Committee consisting of Dmitry Lebedev (Head, Director General), Alexander Germanov, Konstantin Gorbachyov, Faniya Kabalina, Mikhail Klishin, Alexander Markin and Boris Tikhonenko.

Subsidiaries
As of 2005, the bank is a shareholder of the following companies):
 JSC ABRos Investment Company (100%)
 JSC Alfa Invest (100%)
 JSC ABR Trust (100%)
 JSC ABR Security Company (100%)
 JSC ZEST (100%)
 JSC Sankt-Peterburgskie Vedomosti Editorial House (20%, increased up to 35% in 2005)
 JSC newspaper Sankt-Peterburgskie Vedomosti (20%, increased up to 35% in 2005)
 JSC Fund for Regional Development of St. Petersburg (15%)
 JSC Center for Innovative Management (10%).
 JSC Red Chemist (7.36%).

In January 2005 it turned out that ABRos, a subsidiary of the bank, and Accept, one of its shareholders, held a 49.97% share and a 13.5% share of the insurance group SOGAZ Ltd., respectively after a 49.979% share of the SOGAZ group had been sold by the Russian gas giant Gazprom to an unnamed purchaser for 1.69 billion rubles on July 26, 2004, and in August 2004 Gazprom had sold 26% more of SOGAZ for 879.3 million rubles.

In November 2005 ABRos Investment Company (chairman of the board of Directors since September 11, 2006: Lyubov Sovershaeva) purchased a 37% share of the Petersburg TV and Radio Company. Also it owns a considerable share of the Media Holding Ren TV (as of December 2006,) On December 18, 2006 Lyubov Sovershaeva also became the chairman of the board of Directors of the Ren TV Media Holding (replacing Alexey Germanovich, a Severstal Group representative).

As of 2008 and later in 2016, Rossiya Bank has large investments in National Media Group both directly and indirectly through its 100% ownership of Abros which has a stake in National Media Group.

In August 2010, Sobinbank, an asset of Gazenergobank that had been formed by Alexander Mamut, was acquired by Rossiya Bank when it took over Gazenergobank.

In the summer of 2012, ABR Management was established to manage Rossiya Bank's assets.

In 2016, Rossiya Bank's subsidiaries included Channel One, Channel 5, and Ren TV of the National Media Group CJSC, the leasing group Zest, and Sogaz OJSC.

In 2018, Rossiya Bank, Yuri Kovalchuk and Nikolai Shamalov through their investments in the National Media Group and its 100% ownership of Synerdzhy LLC and Otkrytie TV LLC which is 100% owned by Media allians LLC in which Rossiya Bank has an 80% stake, have close relationships with the John C. Malone associated Liberty Media.

Notes

References

External links
 
  
 Bank Rossiya Emerges From Shadows The Moscow Times July 10, 2008 
 Dynamic tycoon is close associate of Putin by Julian Evans, The Times, May 27, 2006.
 Rossia Bank to Reach Federal Level, Kommersant, March 27, 2006.
 Anna Shcherbakova. Interview with Mikhail Klishin, Director general of the Russia Bank. Vedomosti #35(1316), March 1, 2005. (in Russian)
 The Origin of Putin's Oligarchy by Vladimir Pribylovsky. Ms., October 11, 2005. (in Russian)
 The Russia Bank, Map of property in St. Petersburg (in Russian).
 The country of opportunities. Interview with Yuriy Kovalchuk, Sankt-Peterburgskie Vedomosti, July 9, 2005 (in Russian).
 Main Indicators of Bank Activities as of April 1, 2005 Interfax (in Russian)
 Main Indicators of Bank Activities as of July 1, 2005 Interfax (in Russian)
 Main Indicators of Bank Activities as of October 1, 2005 Interfax (in Russian)
 Main Indicators of Bank Activities as of January 1, 2006. Interfax (in Russian)
 Main Indicators of Bank Activities as of April 1, 2006. Interfax (in Russian)
 Main Indicators of Bank Activities as of July 1, 2006. Interfax (in Russian)
 Main Indicators of Bank Activities as of October 1, 2006. Interfax (in Russian)
 Putin's Kleptocracy by Karen Dawisha. Archived on January 29, 2020.

Banks of Russia
Companies based in Saint Petersburg
Banks established in 1990
1990 establishments in Russia
Russian brands
Companies formerly listed on the Moscow Exchange
Russian entities subject to the U.S. Department of the Treasury sanctions